Omar Ryan Ellison (born October 8, 1971) is a former American football wide receiver in the National Football League who played for the San Diego Chargers. He played college football for the Florida State Seminoles.

References

1971 births
Living people
American football wide receivers
San Diego Chargers players
Florida State Seminoles football players
People from Griffin, Georgia
Players of American football from Georgia (U.S. state)